Golbarg Bashi, born in Ahvaz, Iran, is an Iranian-Swedish feminist and former adjunct lecturer of Iranian studies in the US. Among other topics, Bashi has published works and given talks about human rights in the Middle East and the situation of women in Iran.

Biography

Golbarg Bashi was born 06.01.1974 in Iran, raised in Sweden, and educated at the Universities of Manchester and Bristol and obtained her doctorate degree from Columbia University in New York City. Her doctoral research focused on a feminist critique of the human rights discourse in Iran.

Bashi is the author of the children's book P is for Palestine: A Palestine Book, an English-language alphabet book about Palestine, written from a social-justice perspective. The book also promotes Palestinian nationalism.

In 2016, she was nominated for a U.S. toy industry award where she was shortlisted in the Designer/Inventor category at the Women In Toys ‘Wonder Woman’ Awards. Fellow nominees included executives at Disney, Mattel, Lego, and Hasbro.

Bashi is also a visual artist. Her images have been published in the New York Times, Aljazeera English, CNN, BBC News, and Amnesty International.

In 2002, Bashi was a member of the Green Party of Sweden where she was elected as an executive member of the party's Women's Committee. She was also selected as a candidate for the Greens in the Swedish municipal elections for the city of Kramfors in 2002.

She used to be married to Columbia University professor, Hamid Dabashi with whom she has two children. She is an atheist.

Brainquake

In April 2010, Golbarg Bashi launched Brainquake together with Duke University's Negar Mottahedeh. Brainquake was a criticism of the Boobquake event, which Bashi argued was an unhelpful and inappropriate way of drawing attention to legitimate issues. The issue at hand was a statement by Tehran's leader in Friday Prayer, saying that women who wear immodest clothing and behave promiscuously cause earthquakes. Bashi and Brainquake advocates argued that instead of highlighting one's physical differences, women should show off their CVs and lists of accomplishments.

Publications
Among other topics, Bashi has published works about the situation of women in Iran.
 From One Third World Woman to Another: A Conversation with Gayatri Spivak, in PBS's Frontline Tehran Bureau (January 2010).
 Picturing Ourselves: 1953, 1979 and 2009: A Conversation with Negar Mottahedeh, in PBS's Frontline Tehran Bureau (July 2009).
 Iranian Feminism after June 2009: A Conversation with Zillah Eisenstein, in PBS's Frontline Tehran Bureau (June, 2009).
Feminist waves in the Iranian Green Tsunami?, in PBS's Tehran Bureau (June, 2009).
 Genre in the Service of Empire: An Iranian Feminist Critique of Diasporic Memoirs, by Bashi et al., in Znet (January 2007).
 Citizenship Rights in Iran: One Step Forward, Many More to Take. Staatsbürgerrechte im Iran: Nur ein kleiner Schritt vorwärts German version
 تعديل قانون منح الجنسية في إيران:في الطريق إلى المساواة بين المرأة والرجل, in Qantara, Deutsche Welle (September 2006). Arabic version 
The Proper Etiquette of Meeting Shahrnush Parsipur in the United States, Payvand and The Persian Book Review (ISSUE XVI, NO. 48, FALL 2006).
A Historic Landmark: Women's Rights Gathering in Tehran on June 12, in OpenDemocracy and Payvand (July 2006).
|به فارسی Eyewitness History: Interview with Ayatollah Montazeri, Payvand (March 2006). [One Million Signatures] .

See also 
Postcolonial feminism
Third-world feminism
Women's rights movement in Iran

References

External links
Official homepage
Golbarg Bashi's photography

Iranian feminists
Swedish people of Iranian descent
Year of birth missing (living people)
Living people
People from Ahvaz
Women's rights in Iran
Green Party (Sweden) politicians
Swedish anti-war activists
Feminist studies scholars
Feminist writers